Muttahida Qaumi Movement (Pakistan) (   MQM-P) is a Social liberal Muhajir nationalist Secular political party. The leader of the party is Khalid Maqbool Siddiqui The party's symbol is the kite. It is mostly active in Karachi where up to majority of Muhajirs currently reside. The party aims to represent the Human rights of Muhajirs in Pakistan through peaceful and democratic struggle. The Party is the spliter faction of Muttahida Qaumi Movement – London.

History 
The party came into existence due to a split within the Muttahida Qaumi Movement, and was founded as a separate party by Farooq Sattar, who split it from MQM founder and leader Altaf Hussain. The faction was announced after Sattar's release from custody by the Pakistan Rangers, a paramilitary organization.

Election campaigns 
MQM-P participated in two major by-elections since its formation, but was defeated in both.

Senate of Pakistan

National Assembly

Sindh Assembly

Merger with PSP 
In 8 November 2017, MQM Pakistan and Pak Sarzameen Party announced an "establishment-sponsored" merger. However it took a long time before PSP merger was announced by Mustafa Kamal  during a MQM convention with Farooq Sattar and Khalid Maqbool on January 12, 2023 before 2023 local government elections in Sindh.

Party desertion 
Many MQM lawmakers left the Sattar faction in the past, including deputy mayor Arshad Vohra.

PIB vs Bahadurabad faction 
MQM-Pakistan was further divided into the Farooq Sattar (PIB) and Bahadurabad factions.

See also 
 Muhajir Qaumi Movement - Haqiqi
Pak Sarzameen Party
Muttahida Qaumi Movement – London

References

External links 
 – Official website

Pakistani nationalism
Political parties established in 2016
Political parties in Pakistan
Muttahida Qaumi Movement